Jyoti Singh (born 1 October 1966) is an Indian Judge. Presently, she is a sitting Judge on the Delhi High Court.

Career
Singh passed LL.B. from the Delhi University and started practice before the Supreme Court of India as well as Delhi High Court. She became the Senior Advocate in 2011. Singh worked as advocate on behalf of the Govt. of India. She served as a member of Delhi High Court Legal Services Committee. On 22 October 2018 she was appointed a Judge of Delhi High Court.

References 

 

1966 births
Living people
20th-century Indian lawyers
20th-century Indian women lawyers
21st-century Indian judges
21st-century Indian women judges
Judges of the Delhi High Court